DeWitt Clinton School is a Chicago Public School on the north side of Chicago, Illinois.

"One Year Older, One Year Smarter" Program
In 2003, alumnus Jim Mills donated $1 million to the Clinton School to help start the "One Year Older, One Year Smarter" program. This progressive achievement program offers the following cash awards.
  $25 to any students who score higher on the Illinois Standards Achievement Test (ISAT) than they did the year before.
  $50 to the best improvement in the class
  $100 to the two students who score highest in their class.
  $1,000 to the person who scores highest in their grade and to the student in each grade who has improved most from the year before.
  $5,000 to the student who shows the most improvement from the previous year.
In addition, each year Mills presents a $10,000 savings bond to the student with the highest score in the school. Overall, Clinton has scored highest in the statewide ISAT test for three consecutive years.

Other Facts & Famous Alumni

The school mascot is the Clinton Cougar and the school colors are green and gold. Every year 7th graders take a trip to Springfield, Illinois, and the 8th graders go to Washington D.C.

One of the school's most famous graduates is the late celebrity and movie critic Gene Siskel, one-time host (along with Roger Ebert) of the TV show, "At the Movies".

References

Chicago Public Schools
Public K–8 schools in Chicago